Corazones is the fourth studio album by the Chilean rock band Los Prisioneros, released in 1990. Produced by the Argentine Gustavo Santaolalla, in conjunction with Aníbal Kerpel on the EMI label, it was recorded, mixed and mastered in Los Angeles, California being the first album recorded outside of Chile. It was distributed overseas by the Capitol label.

Background 
Before the production of the album, Corazones, between July and August 1989, the group Los Prisioneros recorded at the Konstantinopla Studios owned by Carlos Cabezas Rocuant, "Beaucheff 1435". Whose name is due to the musician's home address Jorge González, where the songs on the album were composed the vast majority. A part of these themes were known in 1996 with the album compilation Ni Por La Razon, Ni Por La Fuerza, and the other remain in public knowledge with Internet. 

Some of these songs mixed melancholic melodies, more intimate lyrics and a couple of dance songs, all led by synthesizers and programmed drums, highlighting pieces such as "En forma de pez", "Ella espera" and "Las sierras electricas". The sound of the album is a continuation of the sonic search for La cultura de la basura, but with elements of house. In addition, González's acute social vision finds its place in "Las sierras eléctricas", with the romantic counterpart of "En forma de pez": a 7-minute suite inspired by Martin Gore from Depeche Mode. González left for Los Angeles, California in October 1989 with only the company of the band's manager, Carlos Fonseca, since Tapia was unable to obtain a visa to enter the United States. Narea had distanced herself after seeing his role as guitarist and occasional songwriter increasingly diminished. 

The production of the album began without the collaboration of Claudio Narea, who left the group in the middle of the work process, in the midst of love problems that were finally reflected in the lyrics distributed on the album. Narea's departure was marked by the hidden relationship between his wife and Gonzalez, but he also had a musical artist: "He did not agree with the sound that the group's leader wanted to give the trio, influenced by synthesizers and electropop that unfolded in the '80." Finally "Corazones" was dominated under Argentine producer Gustavo Santaolalla, who had recognition with his band Arco Iris and collaborating on records for Wet Picnic and León Gieco. All of their previous albums had been produced by González, however Santaolalla brought an "astounding new level of polish" to the band, infusing jagged electronic melodies with "soaring pop" production and regional instruments like the charango to solidify a sonic identity that was "originally and unquestionably Latin American".

Release 
Corazones was released on May 20, 1990 on EMI label. It was certified with four platinum records for selling 180,000 copies. His first single was "Tren al Sur" was released on May 7, 1990, prior to his official release.

Reception 
In 1990, Jorge was chosen as the composer of the year by the Chilean Copyright Society.

Artwork 
The album cover was photographed by Alejandro Barruel and designed by Vicente "Vicho" Vargas, The cover shows González wearing a white shirt with blood on the heart, however the bloodstain is on the opposite side of, this error was not corrected until the 1995 edition. The shirt used was purchased by manager Carlos Fonseca for the photo in a Paris store, located on Lyon venue. "We just knew that Claudio had left. It was very strange to take photos without him", recalled Fonseca.

Legacy and influence 
Some of the album tracks were covered by some singers like: "Amiga mía", covered by Javiera Mena for the 2012 movie Joven y Alocada, Fakuta, covered the song "Cuentame una historia original". Produced by Vicente Sanfuentes and Lego Mustache, the song "Estrechez de corazón" was covered by Carlos Cabezas, Francisca Valenzuela, and the group Villa Cariño. Being recorded in Triana studios by the famous engineer Gonzalo González, with a music video directed by Felipe Foncea. In the tribute album to Jorge González, "Nada es para Siempre", the musicians Gepe and Javiera Mena, accompanied by Cecilia Aguayo, Uwe Schmidt, Felipe Carbone, and Gonzalo Yáñez performed a version of "Cuentame una historia original". In 2020 David Eidelstein, the bassist of Los Tetas known as "Rulo", covered the song "Estrechez de corazón".

Track listing 
Side A

Side B

References 

1990 albums
Los Prisioneros albums
Spanish-language albums